Melamine resin or melamine formaldehyde (also shortened to melamine) is a resin with melamine rings terminated with multiple hydroxyl groups derived from formaldehyde.   This thermosetting plastic material is made from melamine and formaldehyde.  In its butylated form, it is dissolved in n-butanol and xylene. It is then used to cross-link with alkyd, epoxy, acrylic, and polyester resins, used in surface coatings. There are many types, varying from very slow to very fast curing.

Curing
Melamine-formaldehyde can be cured by heating, which induces dehydration and crosslinking. The crosslinking can be carried out to a limited degree to give resins. Either the melamine-formaldehyde resins or melamine-formaldehyde "monomer" can be cured by treatment with any of several polyols.

Applications

Construction material 
The principal use of melamine resin is as the main constituent of high-pressure laminates, such as Formica and Arborite, and of laminate flooring. Melamine-resin tile wall panels can also be used as whiteboards. Melamine formaldehyde is used in plastic laminate and overlay materials. Formaldehyde is more tightly bound in melamine-formaldehyde than it is in urea-formaldehyde, reducing emissions.

Other

In the kitchen

Melamine resin is often used in kitchen utensils and plates (such as Melmac). Melamine resin utensils and bowls are not microwave safe.

During the late 1950s and 1960s melamine tableware became fashionable. Aided by the stylish modern designs of A. H. Woodfull and the Product Design Unit of British Industrial Plastics, it was thought to threaten the dominant position of ceramics in the market. In the late 1960s the tendency of melamine cups and plates to become stained and scratched led to a decline in sales, and eventually the material became largely restricted to the camping and nursery markets, in which its light weight and resistance to breaking were valued.

Cabinet and furniture making 
Melamine resin is often used to saturate decorative paper that is laminated under heat and pressure and then pasted onto particle board; the resulting panel, often called melamine, is commonly used in ready-to-assemble furniture and kitchen cabinets.

Melamine is available in diverse sizes and thicknesses, as well as a large number of colors and patterns. The sheets are heavy for their size, and the resin is prone to chipping when being cut with conventional table saws.

Carbon capture 
Melamine, with the addition of formaldehyde, cyanuric acid, and DETA (diethylenetriamine) has been demonstrated to bind CO2 for purposes of carbon capture, according to researchers at Stanford, Berkeley, and Texas A&M.

Production and structure
Melamine-formaldehyde resin forms via the condensation of formaldehyde with melamine to give, under idealized conditions, the hexa-hydroxymethyl derivative.  Upon heating in the presence of acid, this or similar hydroxymethylated species undergoes further condensation and crosslinking.  Linkages between the heterocycles include mono-, di-, and polyethers.  The microstructure of the material can be analyzed by NMR spectroscopy.  The crosslinking density of melamine resins can be controlled by co-condensation with bifunctional analogues of melamine, benzoguanamine and acetoguanamine.

See also 
 Melamine foam is a special form of melamine resin. It is used mainly as an insulating and soundproofing material and more recently as a cleaning abrasive. 
 Formica is a brand of composite materials manufactured by the Formica Corporation. In common use, the term refers to the company's classic product, a heat-resistant, wipe-clean, plastic laminate of paper or fabric with melamine resin.

References 

Kitchenware
Building materials
Organic polymers
Thermosetting plastics